The NXT Women's Tag Team Championship is a professional wrestling women's tag team championship created and promoted by the American promotion WWE. It is defended on the NXT brand division, the promotion's developmental territory. The current champions are Fallon Henley and Kiana James, who are in their first reign.

The championship was established on the March 10, 2021, episode of NXT. The team of Dakota Kai and Raquel González were crowned the inaugural champions due to winning the first-ever Women's Dusty Rhodes Tag Team Classic, after the WWE Women's Tag Team Championship match they had originally received for their win ended in controversy. At the time the title was introduced, NXT was regarded as WWE's "third brand". In September 2021, however, NXT reverted to its original function as WWE's developmental territory.

History
In December 2018, the WWE Women's Tag Team Championship was established as the sole women's tag team championship for WWE, shared across the Raw, SmackDown, and NXT brands. On the March 3, 2021, episode of NXT, Dakota Kai and Raquel González, who had earned a title opportunity for winning the first-ever Women's Dusty Rhodes Tag Team Classic, faced WWE Women's Tag Team Champions Nia Jax and Shayna Baszler (whose home brand was Raw). After the referee had been knocked out during the match, WWE official Adam Pearce for Raw and SmackDown sent down a second referee to declare Kai had submitted to Baszler, although Kai was not the legal woman. This led to a backstage argument between Pearce and NXT General Manager William Regal.

The following week on the March 10 episode, Regal introduced the NXT Women's Tag Team Championship and awarded the titles to Kai and González due to winning the Dusty Classic; the WWE Women's Tag Team Championship subsequently became no longer available to NXT. Their reign would not last long, as that same night they defended the titles against the runner ups of the tournament, Ember Moon and Shotzi Blackheart, who defeated Kai and González to win the championship.

Belt design
The belt design of the NXT Women's Tag Team Championship is nearly identical to the men's NXT Tag Team Championship, with a few exceptions. The straps are smaller for the women and they are white instead of black. Above the vertical NXT logo on the center plate says "Women's Tag Team" instead of just "Tag Team". For the customizable side plates, the default side plates have the vertical NXT logo instead of the WWE logo. The WWE logo is also missing from the very center of the NXT logo on the center plate.

Reigns
The inaugural championship team was Dakota Kai and Raquel González and they are tied with Toxic Attraction (Gigi Dolin and Jacy Jayne) for the most reigns at two. The team of Kayden Carter and Katana Chance have the longest reign at 186 days, while Kai and González's first reign is the shortest at 56 minutes (being named as first champions, then losing the title later the same night). Candice LeRae is the oldest champion at 35 years old, while Roxanne Perez is the youngest, winning the title at 20.

The current champions are Fallon Henley and Kiana James, who are in their first reign, both as a team and individually. They defeated Kayden Carter and Katana Chance at NXT Vengeance Day on February 4, 2023, in Charlotte, North Carolina.

Combined reigns

By team

By wrestler

See also
 Tag team championships in WWE
 Women's championships in WWE

References

External links
 Official NXT Women's Tag Team Championship Title History

WWE NXT championships
WWE women's championships
Women's professional wrestling tag team championships